John Walter Leuchars (25 July 1852 – 20 September 1920) was a sailor from Great Britain, who represented his native country at the 1908 Summer Olympics in Ryde, Great Britain. Leuchars took the 4th place in the 6-Metre.

Sources

British male sailors (sport)
Sailors at the 1908 Summer Olympics – 6 Metre
Olympic sailors of Great Britain
1852 births
1920 deaths
Sportspeople from Durban